Bystrzejowice Pierwsze  is a village in the administrative district of Gmina Piaski, within Świdnik County, Lublin Voivodeship, in eastern Poland.

Polish journalist and politician Jan Ludwik Popławski was born here.

References

Villages in Świdnik County